Yukta Prasad Vetwal is a Nepalese politician. He contested 1999 legislative election as a Communist Party of Nepal (Unified Marxist-Leninist) candidate in the Jhapa-4 constituency. He was defeated by Minister of Foreign Affairs and Nepali Congress candidate Chakra Prasad Bastola by a margin of 26 votes. In total Vetwal got 15645 votes. After the elections Vetwal ordered a recount by the Special Election Court of Ilam.

References

Communist Party of Nepal (Unified Marxist–Leninist) politicians
Living people
Year of birth missing (living people)